The Province of Uusimaa was a province of Finland from 1831 to 1997.

It was established in 1831, when the County of Nyland and Tavastehus was divided into the Häme Province and Uusimaa Province.

In 1997 it was merged with the Kymi Province and the southern parts of the Häme Province into the new Southern Finland Province.

Maps

|

|

|

Municipalities in 1997 (cities in bold) 

 Artjärvi
 Askola
 Ekenäs
 Espoo
 Hanko
 Helsinki
 Hyvinkää
 Ingå
 Järvenpää
 Karis
 Karjalohja
 Karkkila
 Kauniainen
 Kerava
 Kirkkonummi
 Lapinjärvi
 Liljendal
 Lohja
 Loviisa
 Myrskylä
 Mäntsälä
 Nummi-Pusula
 Nurmijärvi
 Orimattila
 Pernå
 Pohja
 Pornainen
 Porvoo
 Pukkila
 Ruotsinpyhtää
 Sammatti
 Sipoo
 Siuntio
 Tuusula
 Vantaa
 Vihti

Former municipalities (disestablished before 1997) 

 Degerby
 Haaga
 Huopalahti
 Hyvinkään mlk
 Karis lk
 Kulosaari
 Oulunkylä
 Lohjan kunta
 Nummi
 Pusula
 Pyhäjärvi Ul
 Tenala

Governors 
 Johan Ulrik Sebastian Gripenberg 1831
 Gustaf Magnus Armfelt 1832–1847
 Johan Mauritz Nordenstam 1847–1858
 Samuel Henrik Antell 1858–1862
 Vladimir Alfons Walleen 1862–1869
 Theodor Thilén 1869–1873
 Georg von Alfthan 1873–1888
 Victor Napoleon Procopé 1888
 Hjalmar Georg Palin 1888–1897
 Kasten de Pont 1897–1900
 Mikhail Nikiforovitsh Kaigorodoff 1901–1905
 Anatol Anatolievitsch Rheinbott 1905
 Alexander Lvovsky 1905–1906
 Max Theodor Alfthan 1906–1910
 Eugraf Nyman 1910–1917
 Bernhard Otto Widnäs 1913–1917
 Bruno Jalander 1917–1932
 Ilmari Helenius 1932–1944
 Armas-Eino Martola 1944–1946
 Väinö Meltti 1946–1964
 Reino Lehto 1964–1966
 Kaarlo Pitsinki 1966–1982
 Jacob Söderman 1982–1989
 Eva-Riitta Siitonen 1990–1996
 Pekka Silventoinen 1996–1997

References 

Provinces of Finland (1917–97)
1831 establishments in the Russian Empire